Since Wyoming's admission to the Union in July 1890, it has participated in 33 United States presidential elections, always having 3 electoral votes. Wyoming was the first place in America to grant women the right to vote, in 1869, well before it joined the Union in 1890. This was a significant milestone for women's suffrage and paved the way for other states to follow suit. As a state with a strong Republican tradition, Wyoming tends to favor the Republican Party in presidential elections. It has consistently voted for Republican candidates in recent decades and is considered a reliably red state. When Wyoming participated in its first presidential election in 1892, Republican candidate Benjamin Harrison won the state with 50.52% of the vote. Interestingly, Harrison's Democratic opponent, Grover Cleveland, who went on to win the election, did not even appear on the ballot in Wyoming.

Since the 1892 presidential election, the Democratic Party has rarely carried Wyoming in presidential elections. The Democrats' best showing in the state was in the 1936 presidential election, when President Franklin Roosevelt won a decisive victory nationwide. The last time the Democratic Party won Wyoming in a presidential election was in 1964, when Lyndon B. Johnson won a landslide victory across the country.

While much of Wyoming is a stronghold for the Republican Party, Teton County is an exception. In presidential elections since 1988, the county has only supported a Republican candidate once, in 2000, and is considered to be the most Democratic-leaning county in the state.

Presidential elections

Graph

Notes

References

Works cited